Regional elections were held in South Sudan between 11 and 15 April 2010 as part of the Sudanese general election. The result was a victory for Salva Kiir of the Sudan People's Liberation Movement, who received almost 93% of the vote.

Results

President

By state

Legislative Assembly

References

South Sudan
2010 in South Sudan
2010 in Sudan
Elections in Sudan
Elections in South Sudan
Election and referendum articles with incomplete results